William B. Byrnes (May 31, 1906 – February 26, 1989) was an American politician. He served in the Maryland House of Delegates, representing Allegany County from 1971 to 1974 and District 1B from 1975 to 1986.

Early life
William B. Byrnes was born on May 31, 1906, in Eckhart Mines, Maryland. He attended parochial and public schools in Allegany County. He graduated from State Teachers College at Frostburg in 1926.

Career
Byrnes worked as an inspector for the Maryland Motor Vehicle Administration and as a sales manager for W. K. Kellogg Company. He also worked as a teacher. He served in the U.S. Army during World War II.

Byrnes became a member of the Maryland House of Delegates in 1971 and represented Allegany County from 1971 to 1974 and District 1B from 1975 to 1986. He was a Democrat. During his career, he turned down donations and self-funded his political campaigns.

Personal life
Byrnes owned his family's hardware store in Frostburg, Maryland until the early 1980s.

Byrnes died on February 26, 1989, at Sacred Heart Hospital in Cumberland, Maryland. He was buried in the parish cemetery at St. Michael's Church in Frostburg.

References

1906 births
1989 deaths
People from Allegany County, Maryland
Frostburg State University alumni
United States Army personnel of World War II
Democratic Party members of the Maryland House of Delegates
20th-century American politicians